Tosca is a town in Kagisano/Molopo Local Municipality in the North West province of South Africa.

It was formerly the seat of the Molopo Local Municipality, until it was amalgamated to form the Kagisano-Molopo Local Municipality in 2011. Tosca is privately owned.

References

Populated places in the Kagisano-Molopo Local Municipality